Niranjan Singh was an Indian politician . He was a Member of Parliament, representing Madhya  Pradesh in the Rajya Sabha the upper house of India's Parliament as a member of the Indian National Congress.

References

Rajya Sabha members from Madhya  Pradesh
Indian National Congress politicians
1906 births
1968 deaths